Katie King may refer to:
Katie King (ice hockey) (born 1975), American Olympic athlete
Katie King (professor), University of Maryland women's studies professor
Katie King (spirit), name given by spiritualists to what they believed to be a materialized spirit

See also
Catherine King (disambiguation)